Alexander Nahuel Barboza Ullua (born 16 March 1995) is an Argentine professional footballer. He plays as a centre-back, currently for Club Libertad in the Paraguayan Primera División.

Career

Independiente
On 4 July 2019 it was confirmed, that Barboza had joined Club Atlético Independiente on a permanent transfer. The Argentine club bought 82,5% of his rights for four years.

Honours
River Plate
Copa Argentina: 2016–17

References

External links
Profile at River Plate's official website
Statistics at Soccerway.com

Living people
1995 births
Argentine footballers
People from Buenos Aires Province
Sportspeople from Buenos Aires Province
Club Atlético River Plate footballers
Atlético de Rafaela footballers
Defensa y Justicia footballers
Club Atlético Independiente footballers
Argentine Primera División players
Association football defenders